Carex longhiensis is a tussock-forming species of perennial sedge in the family Cyperaceae. It is native to parts of Yunnan in China.

See also
List of Carex species

References

longhiensis
Taxa named by Adrien René Franchet
Plants described in 1895
Flora of Yunnan